Florian Kahllund (born 7 June 1993), also known as Florian Unruh, is a German athlete who competes in recurve archery.

Kahllund first competed internationally in 2013, and in 2014 won the individual title at the European Championships in Echmiadzin and qualified for the World Cup Final, winning the third stage of the individual competition in Antalya.

He won the silver medal in the men's individual recurve event at the 2022 European Archery Championships held in Munich, Germany. He also won the silver medal in the mixed team recurve event.

References

External links 
 
 

1993 births
Living people
German male archers
Archers at the 2015 European Games
European Games competitors for Germany
Olympic archers of Germany
Archers at the 2020 Summer Olympics
Competitors at the 2022 World Games
World Games gold medalists
World Games medalists in archery
21st-century German people